Caulanthus heterophyllus is a species of flowering plant in the family Brassicaceae known by the common names San Diego wild cabbage and San Diego jewelflower.

This annual wildflower is native to the coast ranges of southern California and Baja California. It is a member of the chaparral plant community and is common in areas recovering from wildfire.

Description
This plant has a smooth, erect stem which may be thin or quite stout. The stem produces long, pointed leaves at intervals, and toward the top of the stem produces flowers at similar intervals. The point of the stem is occupied by an inflorescence of one to several flowers.

Each flower is showy, with a magenta to purple hollow urn-shaped body and a mouth surrounded by contrasting white petals which curl outward. The fruit is a silique several centimeters long containing winged seeds.

External links
Jepson Manual Treatment of Caulanthus heterophyllus
USDA Plants Profile for Caulanthus heterophyllus
Caulanthus heterophyllus — U.C. Photo gallery

heterophyllus
Flora of California
Flora of Baja California
Natural history of the California chaparral and woodlands
Natural history of the California Coast Ranges
Natural history of the Peninsular Ranges
Natural history of the Santa Monica Mountains
Natural history of the Transverse Ranges
Flora without expected TNC conservation status